Eva Perón (May 7, 1919 – July 26, 1952), former First Lady of Argentina, has been a consistent presence in popular culture in her homeland and internationally ever since her debut as an actress. The following lists cover various media to include items of historic interest, enduring works of art, and recent representations in popular culture.

Literature and theater

Television and motion pictures

Stage persona homage

Songs
This list does not include songs from the Lloyd Webber and Rice musical, its concept album, its film adaptation, or the film's soundtrack.

See also
Che Guevara in popular culture

References

Ay Juancito (2004) Film about the life of Juancito Duarte, Eva Perón's brother

External links
Evita Story Gets Lively After Death by Chris Klimek, The Washington Post, May 29, 2009

 
Dynamic lists
Eva Perón
Argentina culture-related lists